Unofficial flags are either (a) flags in regular use that have no official status or (b) flag concepts that have appeared in various publications.

Examples of the former type are: Boxing kangaroo, Fighting Kiwi, Chatham Islands, Rotuma, West Irian, Jolly Roger. These are examples of flags used at sporting fixtures, reproductions of no-longer-used historical flags, or used by a regional populace out of spontaneity, though not officially approved (or gazetted).

Examples of the latter type are: North Island, South Island, Stewart Island/Rakiura, 51-Star United States Flag, Antarctica.  These are examples of flag ideas put forward by vexillologists/flag designers that have been picked up by various publications (books, magazine articles, online reference sites, etc.).

Examples

 
Types of flags